A cross-community vote or cross-community support is a form of voting used in the Northern Ireland Assembly according to the provisions of the 1998 Good Friday Agreement. It requires the support of both main communities in Northern Ireland, in other words majority of  unionists and the majority of nationalist members of the Assembly. Among other reasons, it arises when the petition of concern procedure is invoked.

Background 
Upon taking their seats members of the Northern Ireland Assembly are required to designate themselves as either "unionist", "nationalist" or "other". Members may change their designation of identity only if they become a member of a (different) political party or they cease to be a member of any political party.

The election of the Speaker, appointment of the Minister of Justice, any changes to the standing orders and the adoption of certain money bills must all occur with cross-community support.

This was originally set out in the Northern Ireland Act 1998.

Petition of concern

Votes in the assembly do not ordinarily require cross-community support. However, if a "petition of concern" is raised successfully about proposed legislation or executive action, the speaker must call a cross-community vote. For a petition to be raised successfully, at least 30 of the 90 members from at least two parties must sign the petition.

In a cross-community vote, the majority of unionists' and the majority of nationalists' votes are each required to pass a motion put to the assembly. By October 2019, petitions of concern had been tabled 159 times since 1998; they have been used on same-sex marriage, abortion and censure of politicians.

Section 42 of the 1998 Act (as amended by the Northern Ireland (Ministers, Elections and Petitions of Concern) Act 2022) declares that 
 

Arising from the St Andrews Agreement, an "Assembly and Executive Review Committee" was set up. Among its Terms of Reference, the committee was to consider  "provisions for voting on an Ad Hoc Committee on Conformity with Equality Requirements prior to the vote on a Petition of Concern." It also "considered the possibilities of restricting Petition of Concern to certain key areas, changing the 30 MLA threshold, and alternatives to Petitions of Concern (e.g. a weighted majority vote). There was no consensus on any of the issues.". 

In January 2020, negotiations between Northern Ireland's political parties and with the UK Government led to the New Decade, New Approach agreement, in which the parties agreed to greater restraint in their use of the Petition mechanism and to raise the threshold for its use. This agreement was set in law through the Northern Ireland (Ministers, Elections and Petitions of Concern) Act 2022.

Procedure 
According to the standing orders of the assembly, "after the signing of the Roll a Member may enter in the Roll a designation of identity, being Nationalist, Unionist or Other. A Member who does not register a designation of identity shall be deemed to be designated Other for the purposes of these Standing Orders."

Designations 

Note: These figures include the assumed designation of the Speaker who, having a non-partisan role, does not officially declare a designation.  Note also the effect of the Reduction of Numbers Act, which partly accounts for the significant changes in 2017.

Parties 
List of current and previous assembly parties by designation.

Unionist

Nationalist

Other

See also 
Consociationalism
Demography and politics of Northern Ireland

Footnotes

References

External links 
 
"The Nature of the British-Irish Agreement" by Brendan O´Leary
Northern Ireland Act 1998
 
 
 

Northern Ireland Assembly
Northern Ireland peace process
Parliamentary procedure
Power sharing